The 1929 Bowling Green Falcons football team was an American football team that represented Bowling Green State College (later renamed Bowling Green State University) as a member of the Northwest Ohio League (NOL) during the 1929 college football season. In their sixth season under head coach Warren Steller, the Falcons compiled a 4–2–1 record (3–0–1 against NOL opponents), won the NOL championship, and outscored opponents by a total of 76 to 54. Harold Treece was the team captain.

Schedule

References

Bowling Green
Bowling Green Falcons football seasons
Bowling Green Falcons football